The 2016–17 Leicester City season was the club's 112th season in the English football league system and its 49th (non-consecutive) season in the top tier of English football. Leicester City participated in the Premier League for the third consecutive season as well as the FA Cup and EFL Cup. The season covers the period from 1 July 2016 to 30 June 2017. The club also took part in the pre-season International Champions Cup and entered the 2016–17 UEFA Champions League at the group stage. Leicester City entered the 2016–17 season as reigning Premier League champions after winning the Premier League title in the 2015–16 season.

Kit and sponsorship
Supplier: Puma / Sponsor: King Power

Pre-season events
Note: This section does not include close season transfers or pre-season match results, which are listed in their own sections below.
27 July 2016 – Jamie Vardy signs a four-year contract extension until June 2020.
28 July 2016 – Ben Chilwell signs a five-year contract extension until June 2021.
29 July 2016 – Andy King signs a four-year contract extension until June 2020.
30 July 2016 – Callum Elder signs a three-year contract extension until June 2019.
6 August 2016 – Hamza Choudhury signs a four-year contract extension until June 2020.
6 August 2016 – Kasper Schmeichel signs a five-year contract extension until June 2021.

Pre-season

Friendlies

International Champions Cup

Events
Note:This section does not include transfers or match results, which are listed in their own sections below.
10 August 2016 – Claudio Ranieri signs a four-year contract extension until June 2020.
17 August 2016 – Riyad Mahrez signs a four-year contract extension until June 2020.
25 August 2016 – Danny Drinkwater signs a five-year contract extension until June 2021.
9 June 2017 – Alex Pașcanu signs a two-year contract extension until June 2019.
9 June 2017 – Kiernan Dewsbury-Hall signs a two-year contract extension until June 2019.

Players and staff

First-team squad

Backroom staff

Transfers

Transfers in

Transfers out

Loans in

Loans out

Released

Competitions

Overview

FA Community Shield

Premier League

League table

Results summary

Results by matchday

Matches
On 15 June 2016, the fixtures for the forthcoming season were announced.

FA Cup

EFL Cup

UEFA Champions League

Leicester City qualified for the group stage of the 2016–17 UEFA Champions League by winning the 2015–16 Premier League. It was their first participation in this competition. As champions of England, the club was in Pot 1 for the group stage draw.

Group stage

Knockout phase

Round of 16

Quarter-finals

Statistics

Squad statistics

|}

Goalscorers

References

Leicester City
Leicester City F.C. seasons
Leicester City